Tajuria diaeus, the straightline royal, is a butterfly in the family Lycaenidae. It is found in Asia.

The larvae feed on Taxillus caloreas and Loranthus kaoi.

Subspecies
Tajuria diaeus diaeus (Assam, Burma, northern Thailand)
Tajuria diaeus dacia Druce, 1896 (Java)
Tajuria diaeus karenkonis Matsumura, 1929 (Taiwan)
Tajuria diaeus mirabilis Y. Seki, 2006 (Sumatra)

References

Butterflies described in 1865
Tajuria
Butterflies of Asia
Taxa named by William Chapman Hewitson